Olasunkanmi Akande Ajide (born 24 December 1985) is a Nigerian football midfielder. He last played for FC Locarno.

Career

Italy
He started his European career at Reggiana, along with Isah Eliakwu, Obafemi Martins and Adewale Wahab. He was loaned to A.C. Milan Allievi Nazionali team for the 2001–02 season and won 2002 Torneo Città di Arco. He then joined A.S. Roma along with Wahab in summer 2002, signed a 3-year contract. He spent his first two seasons with youth team and Primavera Team, then spent on loan to Italian lower division, for Venezia and Fidelis Andria. He contract was then extended to 2007.

Switzerland
In summer 2005 he left for Swiss side AC Bellinzona on free transfer, located in Italian speaking region Ticino. He scored 6 goals in 1st season. In October 2007 he joined FC Locarno, also at Swiss Challenge League and Ticino.

References

External links
 football.ch profile 
 FC Locarno profile 

1985 births
Living people
Nigerian footballers
Nigerian expatriate footballers
Nigeria international footballers
A.C. Milan players
A.S. Roma players
Venezia F.C. players
S.S. Fidelis Andria 1928 players
AC Bellinzona players
FC Locarno players
Serie A players
Serie B players
Swiss Challenge League players
Expatriate footballers in Italy
Expatriate footballers in Switzerland
Association football midfielders
Yoruba sportspeople
Sportspeople from Lagos